Gardner Edgerton High School (commonly called GE or GEHS) is a fully accredited public high school located in Gardner, Kansas, United States.  It is the only high school in the Gardner–Edgerton USD 231 school district. The school colors are blue and white.

GEHS is a member of the Kansas State High School Activities Association and offers a variety of sports programs. Athletic teams compete in the 6A division and are known as the Trailblazers or Blazers for short. Extracurricular activities are also offered in the form of performing arts, school publications, and clubs.

History
GEHS was built in 2000. In 2004, an expansion increased the school capacity from 1,200 to 1,600 students.

District Activities Complex, has facilities for  soccer, as well  as baseball and softball practice fields. In 2006, the school added a wrestling facility and a  multi-purpose building.

Notable alumni
John Means, professional baseball player for the Baltimore Orioles
Bubba Starling, professional baseball player for the Kansas City Royals

References

External links 
 Gardner Edgerton High School
 USD 231

Public high schools in Kansas
Schools in Johnson County, Kansas
2000 establishments in Kansas
Educational institutions established in 2000